Swing High, Swing Low may refer to:

"Swing High, Swing Low" (song), a 1930s R&B song written by Ralph Freed and Burton Lane, recorded by The Ink Spots 
Swing High, Swing Low (album), a 1991 compilation album by American early R&B group The Ink Spots
Swing High, Swing Low (film), a 1937 film starring Carole Lombard and Fred MacMurray